Frank Clement may refer to:
Frank G. Clement (1920–1969), governor of Tennessee (1953–1959, 1963–1967)
Frank Clement (racing driver) (1886–1970), British racing driver who won the 1924 24 Hours of Le Mans
Frank Clement (athlete) (born 1952), retired Scottish athlete

See also
Francis Clement Kelly, bishop of Oklahoma